Taber Airport  is located  north of Taber, Alberta, Canada.

References

External links
Place to Fly on COPA's Places to Fly airport directory

Registered aerodromes in Alberta
Taber, Alberta
Municipal District of Taber